KJTT is a Christian radio station licensed to Story City, Iowa, broadcasting on 88.3 MHz FM.  The station is owned by Minn-Iowa Christian Broadcasting, Inc.

References

External links
KJTT's official website

JTT